John Woolfe (23 March 1932 – 14 June 1969) was a British racing driver from England, who specialised in sports car racing. He was killed as a result of crashing on the first lap of the 1969 24 Hours of Le Mans race, an event which caused the traditional "Le Mans start" to be abolished the following year.

Career
Woolfe was born in London. He was a gentleman driver, and had several years' experience of racing sports cars. Woolfe was successful in domestic racing, and also entered several international races. The climax of his season was the 1968 24 Hours of Le Mans, where he entered himself alongside Digby Martland, but retired after only 27 laps, persistent overheating problems causing an engine failure. He also owned a Lola T70-Chevrolet.

Woolfe was dissatisfied with the reliability of the Chevron-Repco, and opted to buy a significantly more powerful Porsche 917 for the 1969 event. The 917 was a new car, built by Porsche to exploit a loophole in the entry requirements for the race, and was the fastest vehicle to take part in the event up to this point in its history. Woolfe paid DM140,000 (£16,000) for the car, which was delivered to him at the Circuit de la Sarthe ahead of practice.

Martland withdrew from the event after almost crashing on his second practice lap in the car, judging that it was too fast for him.  Woolfe also over-revved the engine, causing it to fail, but Porsche transported a new unit to be fitted to his car. The German marque also loaned Woolfe two of its works drivers: Kurt Ahrens qualified the car in ninth position, whilst Herbert Linge was scheduled to partner Woolfe in the race.

Death
The 1969 Le Mans race began with a traditional standing start: the drivers stood opposite their cars in the open pit-lane before running to them as the French flag was dropped to signal the start of the race, starting the engines and driving away as soon as possible. In the scramble to start, many drivers did not fasten their seat belts or close their doors properly to save time, and in 1968 Willy Mairesse had been seriously injured after crashing on the first lap when his unsecured driver's door flew open on the Mulsanne Straight. Woolfe was advised by Porsche to let Linge start the race, as he had more experience with the 917, but Woolfe wanted his family to see him start, and was wary of a possible early retirement preventing them from seeing him in action.

Jacky Ickx, the eventual winner, staged a protest against the Le Mans start by calmly walking to his car and securing everything before he got underway, resulting in his being the last driver to leave the starting area. Woolfe, meanwhile, did not fasten his belts and started aggressively, making up several places on the opening lap. At the very fast Maison Blanche curve, however, towards the end of the lap, Woolfe lost control of the 917, which crashed heavily into the barriers, overturned and caught fire. He was thrown out of the cockpit by the force of the impact, and died from his injuries as he was being helicoptered to hospital. It was also reported that Woolfe had lost his door on the opening lap, but this was not confirmed. The 917's fuel tank was torn off in the impact and struck the Ferrari 312P of Chris Amon, causing it to burst into flames. Amon was able to bring his car to a halt and evacuate the cockpit, narrowly escaping serious injuries, though sustaining minor burns.

For the 1970 event, the traditional Le Mans start was replaced by a standing start with the drivers already in their cars, a procedure which was later replaced by a rolling start.

Legacy
After his death at the 1969 24 Hours of Le Mans, John Woolfe Racing was kept going by Arnold Burton and David Riswick in drag racing, and still operates in Bedford as an importer of parts for American vehicles.

In 2009, a French-language book on Woolfe was published, written by Michel Boixière and Michel Fournier and entitled Qui se souvient de John Woolfe ? ("Who remembers John Woolfe?").
Woolfe's Chevron went missing for thirty years, but has recently been discovered in a German barn and is currently being restored.

Complete 24 Hours of Le Mans results

See also
List of 24 Hours of Le Mans fatal accidents

Notes

References

External links
John Woolfe Racing
The Long-Lost John Woolfe Racing Archives
John Woolfe's Chevron B12
L'orée - Qui se souvient de John Woolfe? 

English racing drivers
24 Hours of Le Mans drivers
1932 births
1969 deaths
Sportspeople from London
Racing drivers who died while racing
World Sportscar Championship drivers
Sport deaths in France